Jouni Kalervo Kailajärvi (4 June 1938 – 18 August 2003) was a Finnish light-heavyweight weightlifter who won bronze medals at the European championships in 1961 and 1962. He competed at the 1960, 1964 and 1968 Olympics with the best result of fifth place in 1960. His younger brother Jaakko was also an Olympic weightlifter.

References

1938 births
2003 deaths
Olympic weightlifters of Finland
Weightlifters at the 1960 Summer Olympics
Weightlifters at the 1964 Summer Olympics
Weightlifters at the 1968 Summer Olympics
European Weightlifting Championships medalists
Sportspeople from Tampere